Guangzhou Women and Children's Medical Center, formerly Jinsui Lu Station and Central Plaza Station during planning, is a metro station of the Guangzhou Metro APM line in the Zhujiang New Town of Tianhe District. It is located at the underground of the south of Jinsui Lu, the west of Agricultural Bank of China Building, and R&F Grand Hyatt Hotel. It started operation on 8 November 2010.

Station layout

Exits

References

Railway stations in China opened in 2010
Guangzhou Metro stations in Tianhe District